Jersey Dianne Bridgeman (November 14, 2006 – November 20, 2012) was a 6-year-old girl who was abducted from her Bentonville, Arkansas home in November, 2012, and later found murdered. Her case garnered considerable international media attention in the US and Europe, and spurred debates about child protection in part due to the prior convictions and lengthy sentences for the perpetrators of aggravated child abuse against her, involving a high-profile trial, and the especially heinous nature of that abuse and circumstances surrounding her subsequent abduction and murder.

Early life and abuse case
Jersey Bridgeman was born and grew up in the city of Bentonville, Arkansas, widely known as the seat of the American Walmart retail chain. Following her parents’ divorce, her father and stepmother, David and Jana Bridgeman, began to chain her to a dresser in an apparent bid to stop her from wandering at night, per their statements, getting into medication. The case generated profound public concern and outrage, leading to their incarceration after both pleaded guilty to false imprisonment, permitting abuse, and endangering the welfare of a minor, with David and Jana Bridgeman sentenced to 18 and 12 years in prison, respectively.

Abduction and murder
Jersey was then placed in her mother DesaRae's custody and was frequently tended to by a neighbor, Zachary Holly (born October 8, 1984), and his wife, who served as babysitters. They tended to Jersey and her younger sister on the night of November 19, 2012, helping her mother to place the girls in bed after she arrived home late from work. The next morning, DesaRae reported that Jersey was missing, calling on the Hollys for help. Later that day, her daughter was found in a vacant home in the same neighborhood; her body was naked, and she had been raped and suffocated, apparently strangled by her pajama bottoms. Holly was questioned in the wake of Jersey's abduction and noted to be cooperative, providing a DNA sample and his clothes from the day of Jersey's disappearance. However, forensic evidence was found to implicate him in the crime, and he was shortly thereafter arrested and arraigned for involvement in Jersey's abduction.

Trial and aftermath
Prosecutors eventually charged Holly on counts of kidnapping, sexual assault, murder, and residential burglary, to which he pleaded not guilty. Forensic evidence was considered convincing, and the jury found him guilty of the charges, with a sentence of capital punishment, as well as two life terms and 20 years. Holly continued to assert his innocence and seek an overturning of his conviction, filing a Rule 37 petition in 2019 that he had received inadequate counsel from his attorneys. Jersey's tragic case continued to inspire substantial coverage and discussion internationally, not only due to the murder trial but also the circumstances leading up to her abduction and death, particularly in light of the persistent abuses on the part of those entrusted with her care, and with consideration of potential steps to improve child protection and anticipate possible dangers. Despite the abuse she endured, Jersey was noted to have been a happy and cheerful girl to those around her.

See also
List of death row inmates in the United States
List of kidnappings

References

2012 deaths
2012 murders in the United States
American murder victims
Deaths by person in Arkansas
Deaths by strangulation in the United States
Female murder victims
Formerly missing people
Kidnapped American children
Missing person cases in Arkansas
Murdered American children
November 2012 crimes in the United States
People murdered in Arkansas
Capital murder cases